Soulmaz Abbasi Azad (born 19 January 1984 in Tehran) is an Iranian rower. She competed in the single sculls race at the 2012 Summer Olympics and placed 6th in Final D and 24th overall.

References

 Incheon 2014 Profile

1984 births
Living people
Iranian female rowers
Olympic rowers of Iran
Rowers at the 2012 Summer Olympics
Asian Games bronze medalists for Iran
Asian Games medalists in rowing
Rowers at the 2010 Asian Games
Rowers at the 2014 Asian Games
Medalists at the 2010 Asian Games
Medalists at the 2014 Asian Games